The Web Registry Service is a software component that supports the run-time discovery and evaluation of resources such as services, datasets, and application schemes.

See also 
Open Geospatial Consortium (OGC)

References

Geographic information systems
Open Geospatial Consortium